Barrie James Frost  (1938/39 – 4 October 2018) was a New Zealand-born Canadian psychologist and neuroscientist.

Born in Nelson, New Zealand, Frost was educated at Nelson College from 1953 to 1956. He initially trained as a primary school teacher, and then earned his bachelor's and master's degrees from the University of Canterbury, followed by a PhD from Dalhousie University in 1967. Frost then taught at Queen's University at Kingston. Over the course of his career, Frost was granted fellowship into the Royal Society of Canada, the Canadian Psychological Association, the American Association for the Advancement of Science, and the Royal Physiographic Society in Lund, and received a Humboldt Research Award. Frost died of cancer at the Providence Care Hospital in Kingston, Ontario on 4 October 2018, aged 79.

Selected works
 Annis, Robert C., and Barrie Frost. "Human visual ecology and orientation anisotropies in acuity." Science 182, no. 4113 (1973): 729–731.
 Nelson, J. I., and B. J. Frost. "Orientation-selective inhibition from beyond the classic visual receptive field." Brain Research 139, no. 2 (1978): 359–365.
 Wang, Yongchang, and Barrie J. Frost. "Time to collision is signalled by neurons in the nucleus rotundus of pigeons." Nature 356, no. 6366 (1992): 236.

References

1930s births
2018 deaths
University of Canterbury alumni
Academic staff of Queen's University at Kingston
Dalhousie University alumni
New Zealand emigrants to Canada
Canadian psychologists
Canadian neuroscientists
Fellows of the American Association for the Advancement of Science
Fellows of the Royal Society of Canada
Members of the Royal Physiographic Society in Lund
Humboldt Research Award recipients
Deaths from cancer in Ontario
People educated at Nelson College
People from Nelson, New Zealand